John Skoning Brenner (January 2, 1911 – July 24, 1980) was an American politician in the state of Montana. A Republican, he served in the Montana House of Representatives from 1949 to 1952 and Montana Senate from 1952 to 1966. In 1963, he served as minority leader of the state Senate. Born at Elgin, Illinois in 1911, Brenner attended the New Mexico Military Institute, Montana State University, and the University of Pennsylvania. He was a cattle rancher and lived in Grant, Beaverhead County, Montana. He was also a member and president of the Montana Stock Growers Association. He was defeated for reelection to the state Senate in 1966 by Frank W. Hazelbaker.

References

1911 births
1980 deaths
People from Elgin, Illinois
People from Beaverhead County, Montana
New Mexico Military Institute alumni
Montana State University alumni
University of Pennsylvania alumni
Ranchers from Montana
Republican Party Montana state senators
Republican Party members of the Montana House of Representatives
20th-century American politicians